Identity disorder in the DSM was first listed as a separate diagnosis in version III (1980). In the DSM-IV (1994), it was replaced by "Identity problem", which was not defined as a mental disorder per se, but was listed in a chapter containing problems that might be a focus of clinical attention. Identity disorder was 'downgraded' to Identity problem as research indicated that distress over one's identity is so common that it might very well be considered part of the normality. In practice, if a person's distress persisted or worsened, an Identity problem would often be succeeded by a diagnosis of an actual disorder, such as a mood disorder or borderline personality disorder. In DSM-5 (2013), Identity problem was removed.

See also
Body integrity dysphoria, sometimes also called body integrity identity disorder
Dissociative identity disorder
Gender dysphoria, sometimes also called gender identity disorder
Self-concept
Self-image

References 

Obsolete terms for mental disorders